Mark Jones (born May 25, 1975 in Milwaukee, Wisconsin) is a former professional basketball player who played in the National Basketball Association (NBA). He was undrafted after a career at the University of Central Florida, and at the age of 30 entered the NBA with the Orlando Magic, during the 2004-05 NBA season, averaging 2.3 points per game in ten total games.

In addition to his time in the NBA, Jones played professionally in the Continental Basketball Association (CBA) and NBA Development League in the United States as well as in leagues in Switzerland, France and Venezuela. He was selected to the All-CBA Second Team in 2005.

His nephew, Trey McKinney-Jones, is a professional basketball player.

References

External links
Career statistics

1975 births
Living people
African-American basketball players
American expatriate basketball people in France
American expatriate basketball people in Switzerland
American expatriate basketball people in Venezuela
American men's basketball players
Anderson Trojans men's basketball players
Basketball players from Milwaukee
Colorado 14ers players
Cocodrilos de Caracas players
Élan Chalon players
Fort Wayne Fury players
Great Lakes Storm players
JL Bourg-en-Bresse players
Junior college men's basketball players in the United States
Minnesota Golden Gophers men's basketball players
Orlando Magic players
Shooting guards
UCF Knights men's basketball players
Undrafted National Basketball Association players
American expatriate basketball people in the Philippines
Barangay Ginebra San Miguel players
Philippine Basketball Association imports
21st-century African-American sportspeople
20th-century African-American sportspeople